The 2012 Women's Junior European Volleyball Championship was played in Ankara, Turkey from August 18 to 26, 2012. Turkey won the championship before Serbia and Italy, and qualified to the 2013 Women's Junior World Championship.

Participating teams
 Host
 
 Defending Champion
 
 Qualified through 2012 Women's Junior European Volleyball Championship Qualification

Preliminary round

Pool A

Pool B

Championship round

5th to 8th bracket

Championship bracket

Classification 5th to 8th

Semifinals

7th place match

5th place match

3rd place match

Final

Final standing

Individual awards
MVP:  Damla Çakıroğlu
Best Spiker:  Lisa Izquierdo
Best Server:  Kseniia Ilchenko
Best Blocker:  Mina Popovic
Best Receiver:  Elena Perinelli
Best Setter:  Sladjana Mirkovic
Best Libero:  Dilara Bağcı
Best Scorer:  Irina Voronkova

References

External links
 Confédération Européenne de Volleyball 

Women's Junior European Volleyball Championship
European Championship
European
2012 in Turkish sport
Youth volleyball in Turkey
2012
2012 in youth sport
August 2012 sports events in Turkey